Aerial is an unincorporated community in Habersham County, in the U.S. state of Georgia.

History
A post office called Aerial was established in 1879, and remained in operation until 1919. The community was so named on account of its lofty elevation. The community once contained a schoolhouse, now defunct.

References

Unincorporated communities in Habersham County, Georgia
Unincorporated communities in Georgia (U.S. state)